The 2020 Deutschland Cup was the 31st edition of the tournament, held between 5 and 8 November 2020.

Latvia won the tournament, defeating Germany in the final.

Due to the COVID-19 pandemic, only three teams participated this year. The "Top Team Peking" was composed of German players, in preparation for the 2022 Winter Olympics. Due to the pandemic, the tournament was held behind closed doors.

Preliminary round

Standings

All times are local (UTC+1).

Results

Final

References

Deutschland Cup
Deutschland Cup
2020
Deutschland Cup